The 2007–08 Mississippi Valley State Delta Devils basketball team represented Mississippi Valley State University during the 2007–08 NCAA Division I men's basketball season. The Delta Devils, led by third year head coach James Green, played their home games at Harrison HPER Complex and were members of the Southwestern Athletic Conference. The Delta Devils finished the season 17–16, 12–6 in SWAC play to finish second in the SWAC regular season standings. They won the SWAC Basketball tournament to earn the conference's automatic bid into the 2008 NCAA tournament. As No. 16 seed in the West region, they lost in the opening round to UCLA.

Roster

Schedule and results

|-
!colspan=9 style=| Regular season

|-
!colspan=9 style=| 2008 SWAC tournament

|-
!colspan=9 style=| 2008 NCAA tournament

References

Mississippi Valley State Delta Devils basketball seasons
Mississippi Valley State
Mississippi Valley State
Mississippi Valley
Mississippi Valley